Tiger Graham (born February 10, 1998) is an American soccer player.

Career 
Graham appeared as an amateur player for United Soccer League side Bethlehem Steel FC during their 2017 season after coming through the Philadelphia Union academy.

Graham has committed to played college soccer at Dartmouth College in 2017. In his first season with Dartmouth, Graham made 17 appearances scoring 2 goals.

References

External links 
 
 Dartmouth Bio

1998 births
Living people
American soccer players
Dartmouth Big Green men's soccer players
Philadelphia Union II players
Association football forwards
Soccer players from Pennsylvania
USL Championship players